Long Gone Before Daylight is the fifth studio album by Swedish rock band the Cardigans. Released in Japan on 19 March 2003 and in Europe from 24 March by Stockholm Records, it was their first studio album since the release of Gran Turismo in 1998, during which time band members released numerous solo works under assumed aliases: Peter Svensson issued Paus' sole, self-titled album in 1998. This was followed by the release of the self-titled record from Nina Persson's A Camp in 2001, and bassist Magnus Sveningsson's I Sing Because of You (under the Righteous Boy moniker) in 2002.

The album differs from much of the band's earlier work, eschewing the pop and electronic rock sound of previous material in favour of a sparser, alternative rock and country-influenced production. Its lyrical themes are also more mature, with subject matter inspired by domestic abuse, depression, love and fatalism. It received generally positive reviews from music critics upon release, with several reviewers commending it as the band's best album, while praising their compositional work and the change in musical direction. Several US publications criticised the band for abandoning their old pop sound, and accused them of being ashamed of their former "happy" pop sound.

The band won three awards at the 2003 Grammis —the Swedish equivalent of the Grammy Awards. Long Gone Before Daylight won the "Album of the Year" award while the Cardigans won "Rock Group of the Year". Three singles were released from the album: "For What It's Worth" was released on 17 February 2003. The second single, "You're the Storm", was released on 2 June 2003 and went on to win the award for "Video of the Year" at the Grammis. The third and final single, "Live and Learn", was released on 3 December 2003.

Track listing
All lyrics written by Nina Persson; all music by Peter Svensson, except where noted.
 "Communication" – 4:28
 "You're the Storm" – 3:53
 "A Good Horse" – 3:17
 "And Then You Kissed Me" – 6:03
 "Couldn't Care Less" – 5:32
 "Please Sister" – 4:37
 "For What It's Worth" – 4:16
 "Lead Me into the Night" – 4:32
 "Live and Learn" – 4:16
 "Feathers and Down" – 4:30
 "03.45: No Sleep" – 3:45

Japanese and Canadian editions bonus track
 "If There Is a Chance" – 4:14

UK edition bonus tracks
 "Hold Me" (mini version) – 0:33
 "If There Is a Chance" – 4:14

US edition bonus tracks
 "Hold Me" (mini version) – 0:33
 "If There Is a Chance" – 4:14
 "For the Boys" (Music: Svensson Lyrics: Persson, Larson) – 3:37

The U.S. edition also features a bonus DVD, Up Before Dawn, featuring the music videos for "For What It's Worth", "You're the Storm" and "Live and Learn", live video recordings of three songs as well as a 20-minute interview with the band.

Artwork for all singles and album by Åbäke.

Personnel
Peter Svensson – guitar, vocals
Magnus Sveningsson – bass, vocals 
Bengt Lagerberg – drums, percussion 
Lars-Olof Johansson – keyboards, piano
Nina Persson – lead vocals

Additional personnel
Ebbot Lundberg – guest vocals on "Live and Learn"

Charts

Weekly charts

Year-end charts

Certifications

References

External links
 Long Gone Before Daylight microsite

 The Cardigans' discography at Rolling Stone
 IFPI Sweden
 

2003 albums
The Cardigans albums
Albums produced by Tore Johansson
Stockholm Records albums